Klinai (Greek for couches; singular klinē), known in Latin as lectus triclinaris, were a type of ancient furniture used by the ancient Greeks in their symposia and by the ancient Romans in their somewhat different convivia.

In the later part of the Hellenistic period an arrangement of three klinai positioned in a 'U' shape developed, which together formed the triclinium. Each kline of a triclinium offered room for three diners, and the seating arrangement of the reclining dinner guests was given a strict significance.

A two-klinai arrangement created a biclinium, with the two couches either at a right angle or facing each other. Biclinium (plural biclinia) may also mean a dining couch for  two persons in ancient Rome.

References

Couches
Ancient Roman furniture